Sonié Joi Thompson-Ruffin (born 1951 in Joplin, Missouri) is an American fiber artist, author, designer, community organizer, and curator. Ruffin creates quilts using fabric, symbolism, and references to African textile motifs that explore issues dealing with human rights, race, and gender. Her work has been exhibited across the United States, Africa, and Europe, at the Renwick Gallery of the Smithsonian American Art Museum, the White House Rotunda, and the Nelson-Atkins Museum of Art. She has been a resident artist at the Charlotte Street Foundation and a resident curator at the American Jazz Museum. Thompson-Ruffin is one of the founding members of the African American Artists Collective, a group of African American artists in Kansas City. Thompson-Ruffin was selected to create the Nelson Mandela memorial coverlet by the South African Consulate and the Grace and Holy Trinity Cathedral. Her work is held in collections such as the Spencer Museum of Art in Lawrence, Kansas, and others. Her work has been featured on the front covers of New Letters literary journal and of KC Studio Magazine.

References

Living people
Quilters
American curators
American women curators
Artists from Kansas City, Missouri
21st-century American women artists
African-American women artists
African-American women writers
21st-century American women writers
Writers from Kansas City, Missouri
People from Joplin, Missouri
1951 births
21st-century African-American women
21st-century African-American artists
20th-century African-American people
20th-century African-American women